The score to National Treasure: Book of Secrets was composed by Trevor Rabin and recorded with the Hollywood Studio Symphony at the Todd AO Scoring Stage in October and November 2007. It was the last feature film score to be recorded at the stage before it was closed down.

The soundtrack album was released by Walt Disney Records as a digital download release through iTunes, and no physical discs were manufactured.

Track listing

References

External links
 Soundtracks for National Treasure: Book of Secrets at the Internet Movie Database

2000s film soundtrack albums
Albums produced by Trevor Rabin
Disney film soundtracks
Walt Disney Records soundtracks
2007 soundtrack albums
National Treasure (film series)